American country artist Tanya Tucker has released 25 studio albums throughout her career. At age 13, Tucker released her debut album Delta Dawn (1972) on Columbia Records. It peaked at No. 32 on the Billboard Top Country Albums chart. This album was followed by What's Your Mama's Name (1973) and Would You Lay with Me (In a Field of Stone) (1974), which were both certified Gold by the RIAA. Tucker moved to MCA Records in 1975 and released a self-titled album the same year. It peaked at No. 8 on the Top Country Albums chart and No. 113 on the Billboard 200. Between 1976 and 1977 she issued four studio albums before the release of TNT (1978), which was marketed towards a rock audience. It was also certified Gold by the RIAA.

After releasing three commercially unsuccessful albums, Tucker made a successful comeback on Capitol Records with Girls Like Me (1986). The album peaked at No. 20 on the Top Country Albums chart and produced four top 10 hits on the Billboard Hot Country Songs chart. Tucker released two more successful albums in the 1980s: Love Me Like You Used To (1987) and Strong Enough to Bend (1988). What Do I Do with Me (1991) became her first album to be certified Platinum by the RIAA. The album was also certified Gold in Canada. Can't Run from Yourself (1992) reached No. 12 on the Top Country Albums chart, No. 51 on the Billboard 200 and was certified Platinum by the RIAA. After releasing three more studio albums in the 1990s, Tucker released Tanya (2002) on her own Tuckertime Records. In 2009, Tucker released her twenty-fourth studio album, My Turn, which featured covers of classic country hits. After a 10 year hiatus, Tucker returned in 2019 with the studio album While I'm Livin', produced by Brandi Carlile and Shooter Jennings.

Released songs

Notes

References

 
Tucker, Tanya